Qarah Sufi (also Romanized as Qarah Şūfī) is a village in Charuymaq-e Jonubegharbi Rural District, in the Central District of Charuymaq County, East Azerbaijan Province, Iran. At the 2006 census, its population was 94, in 21 families.

References 

Populated places in Charuymaq County